The James Weldon Johnson Community Library is a public library located in St. Petersburg, Florida.  It is a branch of the St. Petersburg Library System, which services a large area in southern Pinellas County, Florida.

Services and programs

James Weldon Johnson Community Library is a member of the Pinellas Public Library Cooperative and the St. Petersburg Library System. Library patrons may borrow books, CDs, DVDs, audiobooks, magazines and request items be put on hold from libraries throughout Pinellas County. In addition, Interlibrary loan requests are available to patrons on the library's website or in person.

Free Wi-Fi is available, as well as public computers. Printing, copying, scanning and fax service is available for a small charge.

There are two meeting rooms available for library patrons to reserve. Patrons can apply for meeting room access on the library website. Meeting room use is limited to non-profit organizations engaging in library related activities or in educational, cultural, intellectual, charitable, and/or community related activities.

As of March 2016, the library has a seed library where patrons can use their library card to check out various vegetable and plant seeds.

The James Weldon Johnson Community Library is in the process of building a makerspace in the library. Upon completion, free makerspace programs will be offered to library patrons. Programs for adults, teens, and children are offered at the library. These programs include weekly story times, therapy dog reading sessions, a needlecraft club, and African American history classes.

Information on upcoming events is available through the St. Petersburg Library System's website.

History

James Weldon Johnson Community Library is named after James Weldon Johnson, native Floridian author, educator, civil rights activist, head of the NAACP.

His song "Lift Every Voice and Sing" is considered by many to be the "Negro National Anthem."

The history of James Weldon Johnson Community Library is part of African American history in St. Petersburg.

Andrew Carnegie intended for the library he funded in St. Petersburg to be racially integrated when it opened in 1915, but the city refused black residents access to the library. In 1944, the city began allowing blacks into only the basement of the Carnegie library. Mrs. S.M. Carter, wife of a pastor, formed an interracial committee and lobbied the city for funds to open a black library.

On April 1, 1947 the James Weldon Johnson Library opened in a leased space on 1035 Third Ave. S. The original location was a 1,025 square foot room on the ground floor of the Masonic Lodge. It served the community at the Third Avenue location until 1979, when it was closed because of the city’s urban redevelopment project, which displaced hundreds of black residents from the Gas Plant area.

In 1981, the James Weldon Branch reopened in the newly built Enoch Davis Center at 1111 18th Ave. S. Of the city’s five public libraries, the Johnson branch was the only one housed within the confines of another building. In 1990, there were rumors that the library was going to be closed due to funding cuts. Community leaders formed the James Weldon Johnson Friends of the Library, Inc. and circulated a successful petition to save the library. In the summer of 2002, the Johnson Branch Library moved into its current location at 1059 18th Ave. S, adjacent to the Enoch Davis Center. The $2.7 million, 14,500-square-foot building housing about 40,000 volumes was the materialization of the dream of the Enoch Davis Expansion Task Force. The current building was designed by Canerday, Belfsky + Arroyo Architects.

The Friends continue to support the library and hosted the 9th Annual James Weldon Johnson Community Library Literacy Festival in 2019.

References

External links 
 

Public libraries in Florida
African-American history of Florida